The College of Engineering, Aranmula (AEC) is a college in Aranmula, Pathanamthitta, Kerala, India. It is affiliated with the Kerala Technological University (KTU).It was founded in 2014, as part of the Co-operative Academy of Professional Education (CAPE).It is the 8th Engineering College under the Co-operative Academy of Professional Education. CAPE was formed to establish educational institutions to provide education and training, research and development, and consultancy. The society is promoted by the Co-operation Department of the government of Kerala and is an autonomous society.

All India Council for Technical Education (AICTE) has given approval for the conduct of the courses. The state government has sanctioned the 4 B.Tech degree courses.

Admission is through Central Counselling by the government of Kerala. Candidates are admitted based on the Common Entrance Examination. 50% of the seats are treated as government seats, and the balance 35% as Management Quota. 15% of the seats are reserved for NRIs.

About CAPE
The Co-operative Academy of Professional Education is promoted by the Co-operation Department of the Government of Kerala and is an autonomous society under Government of Kerala. The Society is registered under the Travancore-Cochin Literary, Scientific and Charitable Societies Act, 1955 on the basis of the Memorandum of Association and the Rules as approved by the Government of Kerala. The Hon'ble Chief Minister of Kerala, Shri. Oommen Chandy is the Ex-officio Chairman of the Society. The Hon'ble Minister for Co-operation, Khadi and Village Industries, Shri.C.N.Balakrishnan is the Ex-officio Vice Chairman of the Society and the Chairman of its Board of Governors.

Innovation and Entrepreneurship Development Cell (IEDC)
EDC is a non-profit separate independent central facilitating centre within the institution formed to promote the Innovation and entrepreneurship among the students. The formal Inauguration of IEDC was held on 3 March 2016 by Shri. Adv. Sivadasan Nair M.L.A. After the inauguration function a keynote address by Mr. Anoop P Ambika (Chief Executive Officer-Cognub decision solutions Secretary - Group of technology companies, Technopark). The function was felicitated by Mr. Vishal & Mr. Akshai, Kerala Start Up Mission (Formerly Technopark Technology Business Incubator, T-TBI).

Courses

The college offers B.Tech (Bachelor of Technology) degrees in 4 streams as shown in the following table.

See also
 Kerala Technological University
 List of Engineering Colleges in Kerala

External links
Engineering Colleges in Kerala
Engineering Colleges under CAPE

References

Engineering colleges in Kerala
Universities and colleges in Pathanamthitta district
Educational institutions established in 2014
2014 establishments in Kerala